, commonly referred to as Gundam-san, is a Japanese  yonkoma (4-panel) parody gag manga series by Hideki Ohwada. A part of the Gundam media franchise, it is a parody of the original Mobile Suit Gundam anime series, featuring Amuro Ray, Lalah Sune, and Char Aznable as main characters. It has been serialized in Kadokawa Shoten's seinen manga magazine Gundam Ace since June 2001 and collected in fourteen tankōbon volumes.

The manga has spawned an anime television series adaptation by Sunrise. The series of animated shorts was broadcast on the BS11 network between July 6 and September 28, 2014.

Overview
The manga is a parody of the original Mobile Suit Gundam and features most of its characters for its yonkoma strips. On January 24, 2014, Kadokawa released two tankōbon volumes collecting Gundam Sousei chapters as a separate manga titled . At Anime NYC 2019, Denpa announced that they would publish The Men Who Created Gundam in English, with the omnibus volume released on June 7, 2022.

Publication
Gundam-san began as a fan created yonkoma series on Ohwada's personal website prior to being officially published in Gundam Ace in 2001. The manga was also serialized in the seinen magazine Comic Charge from the magazine's inception to its cancellation in 2009; in the magazine Kerokero Ace; and in the 4-Koma Nano Ace from 2011. The first collected volume was released on August 24, 2005 and the latest—the 14th—was released on April 26, 2016.

Another series,  was serialized in Kerokero Ace starting 2007. Its collected volume was released on January 22, 2009.  was released on August 21, 2010. Another book, which included Kotowaza Gundam-san stories, subtitled , was released on December 21, 2011. A Kotowaza Gundam-san , including Naruhodo and Yappari and the proverbs appeared in the anime series, was released on October 25, 2014.

Additionally, a box of mini books and goods about the character Comet Chick was released on July 24, 2007. Also, a fanbook, which included a special story, was released on February 24, 2010.

Anime adaptation
The 13-episode anime television series adaptation was broadcast between July and September 2014 in the BS11 (during the Gundam Selection program) and Tokyo MX networks.  Episodes are about 3 minutes each.  The show was first announced in a Gundam Ace issue in June 2014.  Mankyū directed and wrote the screenplay for the anime. Sao Tamado was the character designer.  Tohru Furuya and Keiko Han returned as cast members but did not reprise their original roles from Mobile Suit Gundam as Amuro Ray and Lalah Sune, respectively.  Instead all of the roles were cast to new voice actors.

Episode list
13 episodes are released on television, while the additional extra episodes (including event premieres) are included in the DVD/Blu-Ray release of the anime.

Reception
Three volumes of the series have been featured on the top 10 of Oricon's weekly chart of the best-selling manga; volume 4 peaked at the fifth spot, while volume 5 ranked ninth, and volume 6 reached the sixth place. Volumes 7, 8 and 9 also reached the chart but at 15th, 29th and 36th place respectively.

The anime DVD and Blu-Ray reached the Oricon's list at the 23rd and 16th place respectively.

References

External links
 

Anime series based on manga
Bandai Namco franchises
Comedy anime and manga
Gundam anime and manga
Kadokawa Dwango franchises
Kadokawa Shoten manga
Shōnen manga
Sunrise (company)
TV Tokyo original programming
Yonkoma